The 1924 Estonian coup d'état attempt was a failed coup attempt in Estonia on 1 December 1924, conducted by the Comintern, and staged by communists (bolsheviks) who in most part had been infiltrated from the Soviet Union. Of the 279 actively participating pro-communist rebels, 125 were killed in action, later more than 500 people were arrested. The Estonian government forces lost 26 men.

Background
The Communist Party of Estonia had affiliated with the Comintern in 1920, and it continued underground activities in Estonia with strong Soviet Russian backing.

The incapacity and death of Vladimir Lenin (January 21, 1924) triggered a struggle for power between Leon Trotsky and  Joseph Stalin. The Soviet Union's foreign policy drifted during this period in relation to Estonia. On 1 December 1924 the Comintern attempted the communist coup in Estonia.

Planning
60 Razvedupr officers were dispatched to Tallinn in the spring of 1924 to organise an uprising.

The latter was a veteran of the Russian Civil War. The plan envisaged the main attack aimed at Tallinn, with subsequent coups in Tartu, Narva, Pärnu, Viljandi, Rakvere, Kunda, and Kohila.

The revolt was supposed to start at 5:15 a.m. The 279 communists, mostly infiltrated from the Soviet Union, were armed with 5 Thompson light machine guns, 55 rifles, 65 hand grenades, 8 explosive devices and 150 pistols. It was mistakenly expected that the workers and soldiers would join the insurgency and would seize power in the capital together. The plan called for the establishment of a Soviet republic with a "working people's government" in Estonia.

Most of the schemes were spoiled by the Trial of the 149 in November 1924, which eliminated many potential communist organisers. The gunmen's first priority was to take over the Estonian National Defence College based in the Tondi suburb south of the city centre, the main narrow gauge railway station in Tallinn-Väike, and a battalion of engineering troops in Nõmme.

Action
In late November 1924, about the time the Trial of the 149 concluded, Moscow decided to launch the uprising on December 1. On the evening of November 30, 1924, the men preparing the attack on the military college were to gather at the Reimann house about one kilometre from the college. There were supposed to be 140 men present, but only 56 turned up. The communists were armed with one light machine gun, four rifles, some pistols and hand grenades. Three messengers were appointed to keep in touch with other groups and the headquarters.

The communist gunmen started to move on December 1, 1924, at 5:00 a.m. At the time there were 450 cadets, non-commissioned officers and officers in the military college. The officer on duty was Lieutenant Joosep Lääne, assisted by a cadet. The three-member guard had just returned to the building after their patrol.

When the gunmen reached their target, they attacked the dormitory of cadets, throwing hand grenades into windows and shooting sleeping cadets on the ground floor. Three guardsmen assisted by four artillery cadets who had managed to get 9 mm semi-automatic pistols from the armory blocked the way to the first floor and opened fire on the attackers. This gave the cadets on the first floor time to get their guns from the armory and launch a counterattack, forcing the attackers to retreat. At the same time a smaller group of insurgents had attacked the cadets' mess, which was empty as the officer on duty and his assistant had left the building.

A patrol of cadets stopped a car coming from the city. Seeing armed cadets, the driver tried to escape, but he and his companions were caught and brought to the military academy. Two of them turned out to be brothers of an insurgent, Rudolf Vakmann, who had been sent to bring weapons from the academy. A court-martial composed of three officers was formed. After a quick investigation it sentenced all seven defendants to death. The sentence was carried out late that night.

Nine cadets were wounded during the uprising. Cadets Arnold Allebras, Aleksander Teder, Aleksander Tomson and August Udras were killed.

Another strike team of communists attacked the Toompea Castle, where the offices of the State Elder, Riigikogu and the Government were located. A third group entered the apartment of the State Elder behind the Alexander Nevsky Cathedral. The State Elder, Friedrich Akel, managed to escape through the back door.

The communists were successful in capturing the military airfield and barracks of the air division in Lasnamäe, where some soldiers joined them. However, the additional units that soon arrived forced the attackers to retreat. Two air force lieutenants were court-martialled for their collaboration with the attackers and sentenced to death. Seeing their failure, the attackers hijacked two military aircraft and tried to escape to the Soviet Union. One of the planes was forced to land close to Narva, but the other plane managed to cross the border unharmed.

In the motorised division the communists got some help from a non-commissioned officer, took over the tank garage and damaged some of the tanks, rendering them immovable. After the non-commissioned officer Loorents was shot by Rudolf Kaptein, another non-commissioned officer, the insurgents ran away.

Another group took over the main railway station, arrested the officer of the day and killed several police officers. As all passenger trains were halted by the insurgents, the Minister of Roads, Karl Kark, decided to check personally on the situation. He was shot and mortally wounded on the stairs of the railway station.

An exchange of fire also took place at the corner of Vene and Apteegi Streets where the Main Post Office was located. The Chief of the Tartu garrison, General Ernst Põdder was in Tallinn on an errand, and was having a drink in a mess with his friends close to the exchange of fire early in the morning. They noticed the skirmish in the street and rushed into the battle.

By 10:00 a.m. the government forces had the situation under control and had retaken all buildings captured by the rebels.

Aftermath
Although the attempted coup was over in five hours, the manhunt for participants continued for several days.

On December 5, 1924, a battle took place near Tallinn in Iru. Police officers shot three prominent Communists: Arnold Sommerling, Evald Ambos and Osvald Piiri. On December 7 there was a police operation in Vilmsi Street in Tallinn. The police raided a house at 50 Vilmsi Street and shot three Communists: G. Kreuks, V. Bogdanov and R. Pälson.

Some of the main organisers, including Jaan Anvelt and Rudolf Vakmann, managed to escape to the Soviet Union. Later, they were arrested and executed by Soviet authorities during the Great Purge.

The Estonian government awarded the Cross of Liberty to ten people for their contribution: Johan Laidoner, Johan Unt, Hermann Rossländer, Rudolf Aaman, Richard Brücker, Rudolf Kaptein, August Keng, Alfred Klemmer, Albert Pesur and August Schaurup. That was the last occasion that the award was granted.

Estonia was eventually invaded and occupied by the Soviet Union during and after the World War II until the restoration of the country's independence in 1991. During the 1944-1991 Soviet occupation of Estonia, the 1924 communist coup attempt was referred to by the authorities as the Tallinn Uprising of December 1, 1924, and described as part of a Marxist world revolution.

In 1974, a monument to the rebels was opened across the road from the Balti jaam, the main railway station. It was demolished in the beginning of the 1990s. People used to joke that it was the only monument in the world that managed to portray all the participants of a coup attempt (there were four figures presented).

Film 
December Heat (2008) directed by Asko Kase, is a drama film depicting planning of the coup and events on December 1.

Literature
J. Saar. . Tallinn, 1925.
 Chapter: Der Aufstand in Reval (The uprising in Reval), in: A. Neuberg (that is Hans Kippenberger/M. N. Tuchatschewski/Ho Chi Minh): Der bewaffnete Aufstand. Versuch einer theoretischen Darstellung. Eingeleitet von Erich Wollenberg, Frankfurt a. M. 1971 (originally published Moscow 1928 under the legend of Zürich), p. 42-66.

Sources 
 Estonian MFA's fact sheet on the coup (in English)

References

Conflicts in 1924
Political history of Estonia
Estonia
Estonian Coup D'état Attempt, 1924
Interwar Baltic state coups d'état and coup attempts
Military history of Estonia
History of Tallinn
Jõelähtme Parish
Communism in Estonia
Coup d'état attempts in Europe